Night Hunter may refer to:

Night Hunter (1996 film), a 1996 horror film
Night Hunter (2018 film), a 2018 thriller film
"Night Hunter" (song), from the Air album Love 2
Night Hunter, a 1989 computer game by Ubisoft